The  is a limited express train service operated by Kyushu Railway Company (JR Kyushu) in Japan. It runs between Hakata Station in Fukuoka, Fukuoka, and Huis Ten Bosch Station, the station for the Huis Ten Bosch theme park in Sasebo, Nagasaki.

History
Huis Ten Bosch services started on 25 March 1992.

References

Named passenger trains of Japan
Railway services introduced in 1992
Kyushu Railway Company